Ballophilus alluaudi is a species of centipede in the genus Ballophilus. It is found in Kenya, Somalia, South Africa, Uganda, Zambia, and Zimbabwe. The original description of this species is based on male specimens with 51 pairs of legs and female specimens with 53 to 57 leg pairs. The adult female specimen measures 29 mm in length, whereas the males range from 9 mm to 19 mm in length.

References 

Ballophilidae
Invertebrates of Africa